Pierre Van Der Haeghen (27 December 1921 – 17 May 2000) was a Belgian sailor. He competed in the Firefly event at the 1948 Summer Olympics.

References

External links
 

1921 births
2000 deaths
Belgian male sailors (sport)
Olympic sailors of Belgium
Sailors at the 1948 Summer Olympics – Firefly
Sportspeople from Ghent